The name Nicole has been used for four tropical cyclones and one subtropical cyclone in the Atlantic Ocean:
 Hurricane Nicole (1998) – Category 1 hurricane that never approached land
 Subtropical Storm Nicole (2004) – formed near Bermuda and headed toward Nova Scotia
 Tropical Storm Nicole (2010) – caused destructive rainfall and flooding in Jamaica
 Hurricane Nicole (2016) – Category 4 hurricane that impacted Bermuda
 Hurricane Nicole (2022) – Category 1 hurricane which made landfall in The Bahamas and Florida

A variation of the name, Nichole, was used once in the western north Pacific Ocean:
 Tropical Storm Nichole (1998) (T9801, 02W) – The latest first named storm ever in the Western Pacific

Atlantic hurricane set index articles
Pacific typhoon set index articles